Chromobox protein homolog 8 is a protein that in humans is encoded by the CBX8 gene.

Interactions
CBX8 has been shown to interact with RING1 and MLLT1.

References

External links

Further reading